IKM Community School District was a school district headquartered in Manilla. The district name referred to the municipalities of Irwin, Kirkman, and Manilla. In addition to the aforementioned cities, it also served Aspinwall.

History
It was formed on July 1, 1992, by the merger of the Irwin and Manilla school districts.

In fall 2008 the IKM district and the Manning Community School District began whole grade-sharing, in which one district sent its students to another district's school for the whole day. This arrangement meant that the two districts consolidated their students into each other's schools.

On July 1, 2011, it merged with the Manning district to form the IKM–Manning Community School District. The merger vote, held on Tuesday April 6, 2010, was in favor of consolidation: the vote tallies were 206–26 at the Irwin polling station and 190–20 at the Manilla polling station, while in Manning the tally was 477–20.

Schools
The district operated an elementary school in Irwin, and a high school in Manilla.

Irwin Consolidated School was formerly in operation.

References

External links
 

Defunct school districts in Iowa
1992 establishments in Iowa
2011 disestablishments in Iowa
School districts established in 1992
School districts disestablished in 2011